Exposed... The Secret Life of The Veronicas is a CD/DVD release from Australian pop rock duo, The Veronicas, released in Australia on 2 December 2006.

The DVD features a rockumentary, which covers the girls' wild ride in music, including everything from their story from 2005 to 2006, never before seen footage and music videos of "4ever", "Everything I'm Not", "When It All Falls Apart" and "Revolution". The CD features live performances from the Australian 2006 Revolution tour.

The release made its debut at number six on the Australian DVD Chart and was certified Platinum by ARIA. In its second week it moved up three spots to number three and achieved double platinum status.

Track listing

Disc 1: DVD
Exposed... The Secret Life of The Veronicas documentary
Live performances
"Everything I'm Not"
"When It All Falls Apart"
"Speechless"
"Mouth Shut"
"Mother Mother"
"4ever"
Music videos
The Introduction
"4ever"
"Everything I'm Not"
"When It All Falls Apart"
"Revolution"
Bonus material: On Tour with The Veronicas

Disc 2: CD Live in Australia 2006 Revolution Tour
"4ever"
"Everything I'm Not"
"When It All Falls Apart"
"Revolution"
"Leave Me Alone"
"Heavily Broken"

Charts

Certifications

References

External links
Product information at Herald Sun HiT

The Veronicas albums
Live video albums
2006 live albums
2006 video albums